Tamara Janice Dobson (May 14, 1947 – October 2, 2006) was an American actress and fashion model. Beginning her career in modeling during the late 1960s, Dobson became best known for her title role as government agent Cleopatra "Cleo" Jones the 1973 Blaxploitation film Cleopatra Jones and its 1975 sequel Cleopatra Jones and the Casino of Gold.

Early life and education
Born in Baltimore, Maryland, Dobson was the second of four children born to Melvin and Evelyn Dobson (née Russell). Dobson started as a beautician. Dobson started her modeling career doing fashion shows at her school, Maryland Institute College of Art, where she also received her degree in fashion illustration. While studying, Dobson was discovered in 1969 and began to film commercials and modeled.

Career
After school, Dobson moved from Maryland to New York to model and act full-time. Dobson modeled for Jet Magazine sometime during her early modeling career. Dobson eventually became a fashion model for Vogue Magazine, in addition to modeling for Essence magazine. She was also in TV commercials for Revlon, Fabergé, and Chanel. Dobson is also recognized by the Guinness Book of World Records as the "Tallest Leading Lady in Film", standing at 6 foot 2 inches. Aside from Cleopatra Jones, Dobson had roles in other films such as Come Back, Charleston Blue; Chained Heat and Norman... Is That You?

Dobson also starred in episode 13 of Buck Rogers in the 25th Century as Doctor Delora Bayliss and in Season 2 of Jason of Star Command.

Health and death
Dobson was diagnosed with multiple sclerosis in 2000. She died on October 2, 2006, at Keswick Multi-Care Center in Baltimore, Maryland, of complications from pneumonia and multiple sclerosis, at age 59. Dobson never married or had children.

Filmography

References

External links
 
 
 Biography
 Actress Tamara Dobson, Star of 'Cleopatra Jones,' Dies At 59, Vibe.com
 The Cocoa Lounge Remembers Tamara Dobson, Biography, Cocoalounge.com

1947 births
2006 deaths
20th-century American actresses
Actresses from Baltimore
African-American female models
American female models
African-American models
Deaths from multiple sclerosis
Deaths from pneumonia in Maryland
Maryland Institute College of Art alumni
Neurological disease deaths in Maryland
African-American actresses
American television actresses
American film actresses
20th-century African-American women
20th-century African-American people
21st-century African-American people
21st-century African-American women